125th Street may refer:

Art, entertainment, and media
125th Street (musical), a stage show which opened in  September 2002 at London's Shaftesbury Theatre

Roads, bridges, and train stations
125th Street (Manhattan), a street in Manhattan, New York City
Florida State Road 822 in Miami-Dade County, locally known as 125th Street
Harlem–125th Street station, a commuter railroad station in Manhattan
Stations of the New York City subway and its predecessors:
125th Street station (IND Eighth Avenue Line), at St. Nicholas Avenue; serving the  trains
125th Street station (IRT Broadway–Seventh Avenue Line), at Broadway; serving the  train
125th Street station (IRT Lenox Avenue Line), at Malcolm X Boulevard; serving the  trains
125th Street station (IRT Lexington Avenue Line), at Lexington Avenue; serving the  trains
125th Street station (IRT Ninth Avenue Line), at Eighth Avenue (demolished)
125th Street station (IRT Second Avenue Line), at Second Avenue (demolished)
125th Street station (IRT Third Avenue Line), at Third Avenue (demolished)